Al-Tijani may refer to:

Abdallah al-Tijani (fl. 1275–1311), Hafsid-era travel writer
Ahmad al-Tijani (1735–1815), founder of the Tijaniyya
Al-Tijani Yusuf Bashir (1912–1937), Sudanese poet
Muhammad al-Tijani (born 1943), Tunisian scholar

See also
Tijani (disambiguation)